Serra da Cangalha is an impact crater in the State of Tocantins, near the border of Maranhão State, in north/northeastern Brazil. Its age is estimated to be about 220 million years (Triassic period). The name means Pack-Saddle Mountains in Portuguese.

Description 
Within the perimeter there is a series of concentric circular valleys and a central basin, all at roughly the same elevation, separated by ring walls.

The impact origin is attested by the presence of impact breccias, quartzite shatter cones and shocked quartz.  The meteorite is believed to have struck the surface at a low oblique angle, 25 to 30 degrees on dry land.  Radial faults are present inside the crater, and some extend up to 16 km from the center.
Disturbed and steeply inclined sediments from the Carboniferous and Devonian periods occur within the crater.

History and studies 
The identification of the structure as an impact crater was first published in 1973 by R.S. Dietz and B.M. French.
Shatter cones were reported by Beatty in 1980.
Impact breccias, impact melting, and shocked quartz were reported by McHone in his 1986 thesis.
A magnetic survey of the structure was published by A.A. Adepelumi and others in 2005.

See also 

 Riachão Ring
 Santa Marta crater

References 

Impact craters of Brazil
Triassic impact craters
Landforms of Tocantins
Geology of Brazil